Kinzua may refer to:

Communities 
Kinzua, Oregon, a ghost town in Wheeler County
Kinzua, Pennsylvania, in Warren County [under the Allegheny Reservoir (aka, Kinzua Lake) since 1965]
Kinzua Beach, Pennsylvania, in Warren County
Kinzua Heights, Pennsylvania, in Warren County
Kinzua Township, Warren County, Pennsylvania

Other 
Kinzua Creek, a tributary of the Allegheny River in Pennsylvania
Kinzua Bridge State Park, located in McKean County, Pennsylvania
Kinzua Bridge, a former railway bridge located in the above state park
Kinzua Dam, a U.S. Army Corps of Engineers dam on the Allegheny River in Pennsylvania
Allegheny Reservoir, also known as Kinzua Lake, formed by the Kinzua Dam